Turjanci is a settlement on the right bank of the Mura River in the Municipality of Radenci in northeastern Slovenia. It lies on the main road from Radenci to Ljutomer.

References

External links
Turjanci on Geopedia

Populated places in the Municipality of Radenci